Fruitville may refer to:

Fruitville, Florida
Fruitville, Minnesota
Fruitville, Missouri